The 2011–12 season of the 2. Liga was the nineteenth season of the second-tier football league in Slovakia, since its establishment in 1993. It began in late July 2011 and ended in May 2012.

Team changes from 2010–11
Trenčín were promoted to the Slovak First Football League after the 2010–11 season.
Dubnica were relegated from the Slovak First Football League after the 2010–11 season.
Spartak Myjava and Podbrezová were promoted from the Slovak Third Football League after the 2010–11 season.
Šaľa and Púchov were relegated to the Slovak Third Football League after the 2010–11 season.

Teams

Stadia and locations

League table

Results
The schedule consisted of three rounds. The two first rounds consisted of a conventional home and away round-robin schedule. The pairings of the third round were set according to the 2010–11 final standings. Every team played each opponent once for a total of 11 games per team.

First and second round

Third round
Key numbers for pairing determination (number marks position in 2010–11 final standings):

Top scorers

See also
2011–12 Slovak First Football League
2011–12 3. Liga (Slovakia)

References

External links
 Slovak FA official site 

2. Liga (Slovakia) seasons
2
Slovak First League